Heterixalus betsileo is a species of frogs in the family Hyperoliidae endemic to Madagascar.
Its natural habitats are subtropical or tropical moist lowland forests, subtropical or tropical moist montane forests, moist savanna, subtropical or tropical seasonally wet or flooded lowland grassland, subtropical or tropical high-altitude grassland, swamps, freshwater marshes, intermittent freshwater marshes, arable land, rural gardens, urban areas, heavily degraded former forests, ponds, irrigated land, seasonally flooded agricultural land, and canals and ditches.

References

Heterixalus
Endemic frogs of Madagascar
Taxonomy articles created by Polbot
Amphibians described in 1872
Taxa named by Alfred Grandidier